The Adamawa  languages are a putative family of 80–90 languages scattered across the Adamawa Plateau in Central Africa, in northern Cameroon, north-western Central African Republic, southern Chad, and eastern Nigeria, spoken altogether by only one and a half million people (as of 1996). Joseph Greenberg classified them as one branch of the Adamawa–Ubangi family of Niger–Congo languages.  They are among the least studied languages in Africa, and include many endangered languages; by far the largest is Mumuye, with 400,000 speakers. A couple of unclassified languages—notably Laal and Jalaa—are found along the fringes of the Adamawa area.

Geographically, the Adamawa languages lie near the location of the postulated Niger–Congo – Central Sudanic contact that may have given rise to the Atlantic–Congo family, and so may represent the central radiation of that family.

Classification
Joseph Greenberg postulated the Adamawa languages as a part of Adamawa–Ubangian (then called Adamawa–Eastern), and divided them into 14 numbered groups. Group G3, Daka (or Dakoid), is now known to be a branch of Benue–Congo. The relationships of the other branches has undergone considerable revision. 

There have also been recent attempts at computationally classifying the Adamawa languages.

Greenberg (1963)
Greenberg's 14 numbered Adamawa groups are:

Boyd (1989)
Boyd (1989) added the Day language and classified them as follows:

 Leko–Nimbari (or Chamba–Mumuye)
 Duru: G4
 Leko: G2
 Mumuye–Yendang: G5
 Nimbari: G12
 Mbum–Day
 Bua: G13
 Kim: G14
 Mbum: G6
 Day
Waja–Jen
 Bikwin–Jen (or Jen): G9
 Tula–Wiyaa (or Waja): G1
 Bəna–Mboi (or Yungur): G7
 Baa (a.k.a. Kwa)
 Longuda: G10
 Nyimwom (or Kam: G8)

He excluded the Fali languages (G11).

Güldemann (2018)
Güldemann (2018) recognises 14 coherent Adamawa "genealogical units", but is agnostic about their positions within Niger-Congo.

Tula-Waja
Longuda
Bena-Mboi
Bikwin-Jen
Samba-Duru
Mumuyic
Maya (Yendangic)
Kebi-Benue (Mbumic)
Kimic
Buaic
Day
Baa = Kwa
Nyingwom = Kam
Fali

Kleinewillinghöfer (2019)
Kleinewillinghöfer (2019), in the Adamawa Languages Project website, recognises the following 17 groups as Adamawa languages.
Tula-Waja (Waja): G1
Bikwin-Jen (Burak, Jen): G9
Kam (Nyiŋɔm, Nyiwom, Nyingwom): G8
Longuda (Nʋngʋra cluster): G10
Baa (Kwa)
Mumuye: G5
Yandang (Yendang): G5
Samba-Duru (Chamba-Leko, Leko, Duru, Sama-Duru, Samba Leeko): G2, G4
Ɓəna-Mboi (Yungur): G7<ref>Kleinewillinghöfer, Ulrich. 1992 [2014]. Evidence of noun classes in languages of the Yungur group. Adamawa Languages Project.</ref>
Kebi-Benue (Mbum): G6
Kim: G14DayBua: G13Nimbari (Baari, Bari): G12 [extinct]Duli - Gewe (Gey, Gueve) [extinct]
? Fali: G11
? Chamba-Daka (Daka): G3

Only the Tula-Waja, Longuda, Ɓəna-Mboi, Samba-Duru, and Bua groups have noun classes. The other groups only display vestiges of formerly active noun class systems.

Blench (2012, 2020)
Roger Blench (2012) concludes that the Adamawa languages are a geographic grouping, not a language family, and breaks up its various branches in his proposed Savannas family. He places some of the western Adamawa languages closer to the Gur languages than to other Adamawa families. Fali is tentatively excluded from Savannas altogether. Blench (2020) retains a connection between Mumuye and Yendang, but breaks up Kleinewillinghöfer's Samba-Duru.

Unclassified Adamawa languages
The Oblo language of Cameroon has been included in several versions of the Adamawa group, but its position within it is unclear.

It has been speculated that the unclassified Laal language of Chad may be Adamawa; the Jalaa language of Nigeria is probably not Adamawa, but shows heavy Adamawa influence. However, both are generally now considered to be language isolates.

Comparative vocabulary

Sample basic vocabulary of Adamawa languages from Kleinewillinghöfer's Adamawa Languages Project website and various other sources:Note'': In table cells with slashes, the singular form is given before the slash, while the plural form follows the slash.

Numerals
Comparison of numerals in individual languages:

See also
Savannas languages
Gur languages

References

External links
 Adamawa Language Projects (Johannes Gutenberg University Mainz)
 AdaGram (CNRS-INALCO). Exploring Nigeria’s linguistic wealth: grammatical analysis and linguistic documentation of the Adamawa languages.
 List of Adamawa languages – Blench
 Tula-Wiyaa languages – Blench
 Leeko group – Blench
 The Perema (Wom) language of northeastern Nigeria: classification, phonology and noun morphology (PDF) by Roger M. Blench, 2000. Mallam Dendo, Cambridge.
 A rapid appraisal survey of Gbete (PDF) by Jason Diller & Kari Jordan-Diller, 2002. SIL Electronic Survey Reports SILESR 2002-050.
 A sociolinguistic survey of the Mambay language of Chad and Cameroon (PDF) by Cameron Hamm, 2002. SIL Electronic Survey Reports SILESR 2002-039.
 Rapid appraisal and lexicostatistical analysis surveys of Dama, Mono, Pam, Ndai and Oblo (PDF) by Michael & Charlene Ayotte, 2002. SIL Electronic Survey Reports SILESR 2002-048.
 Karang – SIL-Cameroon
 SIL-Cameroon bibliography
 Vocabulaires comparés des instruments aratoires dans le Nord-Cameroun, Tourneaux
 Idiatov, Dmitry. 2017-08-29. Results of the first AdaGram survey in Adamawa and Taraba States, Nigeria. (with Mark Van de Velde, Tope Olagunju and Bitrus Andrew). 47th Colloquium on African Languages and Linguistics (CALL) (Leiden, Netherlands).

 
Volta–Congo languages